Yo-kai Watch: The Movie, released in Japan under the name Yo-kai Watch: Tanjō no Himitsu da Nyan!, is a 2014 Japanese animated fantasy adventure film directed by Shigeharu Takahashi and Shinji Ushiro as part of the Yo-kai Watch franchise. The film was released on December 20, 2014 in Japan. It was followed by Enma Daiō to Itsutsu no Monogatari da Nyan!, released on December 19, 2015.

Plot

The Plot is the same as Yo Kai Watch 2, but with some changes. One night, the evil Yo-kai Kin and Gin steal the Yo-kai Watch from Nate Adams to help their master Dame Dedtime prevent humans and Yo-kai from being friends. He then encounters Meganyan, who tells him that Yo-Kai are real. He and the crew head to Nate's grandmother, encounter a shadow, and chase it, but to no avail. Meganyan returns, asking to pull out the cork in his body—the cork that suppresses his energy. Nate decides not to pull it out, and asks Jibanyan & Whisper to pull it out for him, but to no avail. Nate pulls it out, and he and the crew get covered in pink smoke. He finds help from the Yo-kai Hovernyan - and uses a time stone to take Nate, Whisper, and Jibanyan back in time 60 years to when the Yo-kai Watch was first invented by Nate's own grandfather Nathaniel while he was a kid. Dame Dedtime gets word of this, and tries a plan to push the human world farther from the Yo-kai world. Together, the two boys battle Dame Dedtime and her evil Wicked Yo-kai minions to save the world from her evil plans.

Voice cast

Production

Music
The film's score was written Kenichiro Saigo.

Opening Theme
"Gera Gera Po (Movie Version)" by King Cream Soda (Japan)
"Yo-kai Watch" by Basilio Fernando Ferreira (USA)
Ending Theme
"Yo-kai Medley" by Yo-kai King Dream Soda & "Kuwagata to Kabutomushi" by King Cream Soda (Japan & USA)

Release

Marketing
The film was announced in July 2014 on CoroCoro Comic. The first trailer was released in August and another trailer was released in October. A second film was announced in November. A story tie-in to the film was included in the video game Yo-kai Watch 2: Shinuchi, released on December 13. A manga of the film, illustrated by Noriyuki Konishi, was released in December, reaching the 30th place on the weekly chart with 32,561 copies sold on its first week, and selling 261,145 copies by its fifth week.

Kumamon
In some scenes of the movie the famous mascot, Kumamon is seen. He also appeared in Yo-Kai Watch 2 in a scene in a quest to get Harry Barry.

Home media
The Blu-ray and DVD were released on July 8, 2015, with both reaching the number-one place on the animation rankings, with 14,090 and 84,932 copies sold, respectively. By its 13th week, the DVD had sold 128,810 copies.

Western release
In September 2016, it was revealed via the Fathom Events website that the movie would be screened one time only on October 15, in select cinemas across the United States. Attendees received an exclusive Hovernyan medal at the screening. It made its premiere on American television on Disney XD on Saturday, November 12, 2016 after the premiere of the "Yo-kai Watch" anime episode "Whisper's Secret Past", with further showings on Sunday, November 13 and Monday on the 14. It was released on Netflix on December 1, 2016 in the United States, it was removed on Netflix on March 3, 2021. Its DVD was released on May 19, 2020, nearly four years after its theatrical release. the film was distributed by Wild Bunch in France, 01 Distribution In Italy, Buena Vista International in Turkey, Selecta Vision in Spain and Universal Pictures in some countries.

Reception

Box office
The film set a new record for Toho for advance ticket sales, with 721,422 sold by October 26, reaching 840,000 by late November and more than 1 million by mid-December.

The film grossed  at the Japanese box office, where it was the highest-grossing domestic film of 2015.

Overseas, the film grossed  upon its opening in South Korea, and went on to gross  there. The film also grossed $257,343 in the United States and Canada, and $1,715,393 in France, the United Arab Emirates, and Thailand. The film grossed a total of  worldwide.

Critical reception
Kotakus Mike Fahey described the movie as keeping the humor of the TV show even in its highest dramatic stakes.
Anime News Network reviewer James Beckett liked the humor, but was bothered by the pacing issues. He gave it a B grading.

Rotten Tomatoes gave the film an 80% with average rating of 6.6/10 based on 5 critics reviews.

Notes

References

External links

2010s fantasy adventure films
2014 anime films
Adventure anime and manga
Anime films based on video games
Animated adventure films
Japanese fantasy adventure films
Japanese animated fantasy films
OLM, Inc. animated films
Toho animated films
Animated films about time travel
Yo-kai Watch films
Films about size change
Anime and manga about time travel